Ivan Vasilev may refer to:
 Ivan Vasilev (footballer, born 1967)
 Ivan Vasilev (footballer, born 2001)